Amanda Berry may refer to:

 Amanda Marie Berry (born 1986), Cleveland kidnapping survivor
 Amanda Sonia Berry (born 1961), Chief Executive of the British Academy of Film and Television Arts (BAFTA)
 Amanda Berry Smith (1837–1915), American religious leader and former slave

See also 
 Amanda Barrie (born 1935), English actress